Ralph Liggons or Lygon (1540-1619) was an English Catholic involved in conspiracies and a supporter of Mary, Queen of Scots.

Family background
He was a member of the Worcestershire Lygon family, a son of William Lygon (died 1567) and his wife Eleanor Denys. His brother Richard (died 1584) was head of the family, based at Madresfield Court, and his nephew William Lygon was a Member of Parliament. Several contemporary records include his surname written as "Liggons" or "Ligons". These spelling are preferred by historians.

Career

Ralph Liggons attended the baptism of James VI at Stirling Castle in December 1566. Mary, Queen of Scots gave him a gold chain. He was involved in the Rising of the North in 1569, and plotted with Thomas Howard, 4th Duke of Norfolk and Mary, Queen of Scots. He received a pension from Philip II of Spain. He was an exile in Brussels and Paris after the revealing of the Ridolfi Plot. Mary, Queen of Scots also left him a pension in her will.

Liggons was involved in the 1605 Gunpowder Plot.

References

16th-century English people
1619 deaths
1540 births
Ralph